"Back 2 You" / "Still Grey" is the third single by Australian drum and bass band Pendulum. It was released on 22 March 2004 by independent label Timeless Recordings, and was their first and only release with the label. The song "Still Grey" featured guest guitarist Evan Short of Concord Dawn, and was included on the CD edition of Hold Your Colour, released in July 2005.

Background and writing 
Both tracks of "Back 2 You" / "Still Grey" were written and produced by Rob Swire and Paul Harding, "Back 2 You" was also written and produced by Gareth McGrillen. The single was the first release by Pendulum to feature either a guest instrumentalist, or a guest vocalist. The song "Back 2 You" featured singer Lisa Lindt, while the electric guitar in "Still Grey" was played by Evan Killjoy, better known as Evan Short of New Zealand drum and bass duo Concord Dawn.

Critical reception 
Unlike Pendulum's previous single, "Back 2 You" / "Still Grey" did not receive much publicity or recognition, and consequently neither track has been subject to many critical reviews. This is particularly true of "Back 2 You", which has not been featured on any studio or compilation album released by Pendulum to date. One review of Hold Your Colour describes "Still Grey" as "chilled but entertaining", although the reviewer gripes that "after such a powerful intro, [he] was hoping for a dramatic exeunt and what they deliver is a cool fade out". Another review describes the song as "a fantastic piece of liquid dancefloor action".

Marketing and release 
"Back 2 You" / "Still Grey" was released on 22 March 2004 as a standard 12-inch single by independent label Timeless Recordings. It was Pendulum's first and only release with the label to date, which has also released material for guest guitarist Evan Short's band, Concord Dawn. The song "Still Grey" was featured on the CD edition of Hold Your Colour, released in July 2005, but was later replaced by the song "Axle Grinder" when the album was reissued in July 2007. "Back 2 You" was not included on any other release by Pendulum, but was featured on two compilation albums including Drum & Bass Arena, mixed by Andy C.

Track listing 
This is the track listing for "Back 2 You" / "Still Grey". "Back 2 You" was written and produced by Rob Swire, Paul Harding, and Gareth McGrillen. "Still Grey" was written and produced by Rob Swire and Paul Harding.

12-inch vinyl single 

A. "Back 2 You" – 6:26
AA. "Still Grey" – 7:49

Personnel 
The following people contributed to "Back 2 You" / "Still Grey".

Pendulum

 Rob Swire – writer, producer, vocals, mixing
 Paul Harding – writer, producer
 Gareth McGrillen – writer, producer

Other contributors
 Lisa Lindt – vocals on "Back 2 You"
 Evan Short – guitar on "Still Grey"
 Stuart Hawkes – mastering

References

External links 
 Back 2 You / Still Grey at Discogs
 Back 2 You / Still Grey at MusicBrainz
 Back 2 You / Still Grey at SoundUnwound

2004 singles
Songs written by Rob Swire
Pendulum (drum and bass band) songs